Waitsburg is a city in Walla Walla County, Washington, United States. The population was 1,166 at the 2020 census. Waitsburg has a unique city classification in Washington state, being the state's only city which still operates under its territorial charter.

History
Waitsburg was first settled in 1859 by Robert Kennedy.  It was named for Sylvester M. Wait, who established a mill there in 1864. Wait previously established and named the city of Phoenix, Oregon, several years earlier.
William Perry Bruce and his wife, Caroline, moved to Waitsburg in 1861, some two decades before Waitsburg was officially incorporated on November 25, 1881.  In 1882, they built a large home in the town, which today functions as a museum.

Geography

Climate
This region experiences warm (but not hot) and dry summers, with no average monthly temperatures above 71.6 °F (22°C). According to the Köppen Climate Classification system, Waitsburg has a warm-summer Mediterranean climate, abbreviated "Csb" on climate maps.

Demographics

2010 census
As of the census of 2010, there were 1,217 people, 475 households, and 328 families residing in the city. The racial makeup of the city was 93.1% White, 0.2% African American, 1.5% Native American, 0.7% Asian, 0.2% Pacific Islander, 1.9% from other races, and 2.3% from two or more races. Hispanic or Latino of any race were 5.3% of the population.

There were 475 households, of which 37.5% had children under the age of 18 living with them, 53.3% were married couples living together, 10.7% had a female householder with no husband present, 5.1% had a male householder with no wife present, and 30.9% were non-families. 25.7% of all households were made up of individuals, and 14.7% had someone living alone who was 65 years of age or older. The average household size was 2.56 and the average family size was 3.04.

The median age in the city was 41 years. 26.4% of residents were under the age of 18; 8% were between the ages of 18 and 24; 21.2% were from 25 to 44; 28.4% were from 45 to 64; and 16.1% were 65 years of age or older. The gender makeup of the city was 49.6% male and 50.4% female.

2000 census
As of the census of 2000, there were 1,212 people, 490 households, and 314 families residing in the city. The population density was 1,279.5 people per square mile (492.6/km2). There were 522 housing units at an average density of 551.1 per square mile (212.2/km2). The racial makeup of the city was 94.80% White, 0.58% African American, 0.41% Native American, 0.66% Asian, 1.16% from other races, and 2.39% from two or more races. Hispanic or Latino of any race were 2.81% of the population.

There were 490 households, out of which 32.9% had children under the age of 18 living with them, 51.0% were married couples living together, 9.0% had a female householder with no husband present, and 35.9% were non-families. 31.4% of all households were made up of individuals, and 15.9% had someone living alone who was 65 years of age or older. The average household size was 2.47 and the average family size was 3.13.

In the city, the age distribution of the population shows 29.7% under the age of 18, 5.4% from 18 to 24, 24.8% from 25 to 44, 23.5% from 45 to 64, and 16.6% who were 65 years of age or older. The median age was 39 years. For every 100 females, there were 97.4 males. For every 100 females age 18 and over, there were 92.3 males.

The median income for a household in the city was $33,527, and the median income for a family was $40,865. Males had a median income of $31,625 versus $21,518 for females. The per capita income for the city was $16,803. About 10.6% of families and 14.0% of the population were below the poverty line, including 14.8% of those under age 18 and 10.0% of those age 65 or over.

References

External links

 
 History of Waitsburg at HistoryLink

Cities in Washington (state)
Cities in Walla Walla County, Washington
Populated places established in 1859
1859 establishments in Washington Territory